This article contains a list of fossil-bearing stratigraphic units in the state of New Hampshire, U.S.

Sites

See also

 Paleontology in New Hampshire

References

 

New Hampshire
Stratigraphic units
Stratigraphy of New Hampshire
New Hampshire geography-related lists
United States geology-related lists